Kim Pok-sin (김복신,b. 1925 -) is a North Korean politician. 

She was Vice-Minister of Light Industry in 1958-1966, and Minister of Textile and Paper Manufacturing Industry between 1971 and 1981. 

She served as Deputy Director of the Puongyang Local General Bureau of Industry 1966-1969.  

From 1981, she served in the Light Industry Commission as Chairperson of the Committee for Light Industry. 

In 1981, she was made Vice-Chairperson of the Council of Ministers of the Administration Council. She served as Vice Premier between 1981 and 1996. 

She was appointed Alternate member of the Politburo in 1983.

See also

Government of North Korea
List of elected or appointed female deputy heads of government
Premier of North Korea

References

20th-century North Korean women politicians
20th-century North Korean politicians
Living people
Year of birth missing (living people)
Place of birth missing (living people)
Women government ministers of North Korea